The first Bank of South Australia was founded by the South Australian Company in 1837 and became defunct in 1892.

It was essentially a British venture, closely supervised by British directors, but utilizing the knowledge and advice of local managers in South Australia.

History
It was created in 1837 by British investors. From 1840, it was associated with or a subsidiary of the South Australian Banking Company. From 1868, there was only one body, the Bank of South Australia.

At the time of the gold rush, and the South Australia Colony was beset with, apart from the shortage of workers, a financial crisis due to the sudden increase in the availability of gold and the lack of sufficient currency to pay for it. The manager, George Tinline, created an assay office and mint, and the conversion of some of the diggers' gold to bullion which could be used as a form of currency. A Bullion Act was passed and some 25,000 £1 coins were minted, but were not recognised as legal currency by the Bank of England. Tinline was awarded a purse of 2,000 guineas (£2,200; several millions of dollars in today's money), and an elaborate silver salver (now in the Art Gallery of South Australia). Tinline was sacked by the bank in 1859 after severe losses caused by a customer defaulting.

Foundation
Officers:
David McLaren, manager 
Edward Stephens, cashier and acting manager
Board of Directors:
George Fife Angas
Raikes Currie, M.P.
Charles Hindley, M.P.
Henry Kingscote
John Pirie
Christopher Rawson 
John Rundle, M.P.
Thomas Smith
James Ruddell-Todd
Henry Waymouth

Managers
(later occasionally titled "Colonial Manager" – South Australian Company title or to distinguish from branch managers?)
David McLaren 1837
Edward Stephens – officially from 1841 (but in practice from a much earlier date) to c. 1856
John Coleman Dixon (acting manager, then manager of South Australian Banking Company / Bank of South Australia from 1855 to 1865)
William Selby Douglas (previously manager Gawler branch) 1864 to 1869
Thomas Drury Smeaton (previously manager Robe branch) occasionally between 1870 and 1884
William G. Cuthbertson to 1878? 
John Currie 1879 to 1884
Vipont Howgate 1884 to 1886
Anderson (acting pro tem)
John White Meldrum (died 12 January 1898) 1887 to 1891
J. L. Ogilvie (1891 to 1892)

In 1892, under pressure of falling share values, and following collapse of banks in Victoria, the Bank of South Australia was taken over by the Union Bank of Australia.

References 

Defunct banks of Australia
History of Adelaide
Banks established in 1837
1837 establishments in Australia
Banks disestablished in 1892
1892 disestablishments in Australia